Chicago Party Aunt is an American animated sitcom created by Chris Witaske, Jon Barinholtz, and Katie Rich for Netflix, inspired by Witaske's Twitter account. The first eight episodes premiered September 17, 2021. The second part premiered on December 30, 2022.

Voice cast
 Lauren Ash as Diane Dunbrowski, also known as the Chicago Party Aunt, the life of the party who avoids adulting and a hairdresser at the formerly Chi City Sports Cuts and Clips, now called Borough
 Rory O'Malley as Daniel, Diane's gay nephew who decided to live with her and take a gap year instead of going to Stanford University
 RuPaul Charles as Gideon, the new manager at Chi City Sports Cuts and Clips who renames the salon as Borough
 Jill Talley as Bonnie, Diane's sister and Daniel's mother
 Ike Barinholtz as Mark, Bonnie's husband
 Jon Barinholtz as Mikey, Diane and Kurt's obese son who works at Midway International Airport as a baggage handler
 Bob Odenkirk as Feather
 Da'Vine Joy Randolph as Tina
 Katie Rich as Zuzana
 Chris Witaske as Kurt, Diane's second time ex-husband and a TSA agent at Midway International Airport

Production

Development
On July 27, 2021, Netflix gave a 16-episode series order to Chicago Party Aunt. The series is created by Chris Witaske, Jon Barinholtz, and Katie Rich inspired by the eponymous Twitter account by Witaske. Witaske, Barinholtz, and Rich were expected to executive produce alongside Ike Barinholtz, David Stassen, Will Gluck, Richard Schwartz, Chris Prynoski, Antonio Canobbio, and Ben Kalina. The production companies involved with the series are 23/34, Olive Bridge Entertainment, and Titmouse, Inc.

Casting
Upon series order announcement, it was reported that the voice cast includes Lauren Ash, Rory O'Malley, RuPaul Charles, Jill Talley, Ike Barinholtz, Jon Barinholtz, Da'Vine Joy Randolph, Rich, and Witaske.

Release
Chicago Party Aunt is set to be released in two parts. The first eight episodes were released on September 17, 2021. The rest of the eight episodes were released on December 30, 2022.

Reception
Part 1 of Chicago Party Aunt received generally mixed reviews from critics. The review aggregator website Rotten Tomatoes reported a 43% approval rating with an average rating of 7.50/10, based on 7 critic reviews. Metacritic gave the series a weighted average score of 56 out of 100 based on 4 critics, indicating "mixed or average reviews". For Part 1, Daniel Fienberg from The Hollywood Reporter stated that "too often the show consists of local references, funny pronunciations, and then a semisweet ending that fails to land convincingly." Reviewing the series for Chicago Sun-Times, Richard Roeper gave a rating of 3/4 stars and said, "The fun-loving reveler from Twitter is surrounded by so many lovable characters, we can forgive all the Fridge and Malort references."

Part 2 received more positive reviews. Rendy Jones from Paste stated that while the show needs more laughs and suffers from the same problems a lot of Netflix adult animation has, and Diane's raunchy behavior is retained, "the episodic plots organically test her ability to mature and embrace change in her life. I don’t think I’ve seen an adult animated series follow a woman’s attempt to find affordable healthcare so she can get a breast implant removal surgery procedure done to better her health, and I give this show kudos for approaching that humorously and thoughtfully." Andrew Munnik from Comic Book Resources stated that Part 2 is "blazing a new trail for LGBT+ representation in television." Johnny Loftus from Decider recommends Part 2, stating that "it's easy, especially with such a low-intensity run-time. Chicago Party Aunt generates some laughs with its feel for the city’s slang. But it’s the toon’s consistently excellent voice cast that really keeps it in the game."

Episodes

References

External links 
 
 
 

2020s American adult animated television series
2020s American animated comedy television series
2021 American television series debuts
2020s American LGBT-related animated television series
American adult animated comedy television series
American flash adult animated television series
English-language Netflix original programming
Animated television series by Netflix
Television shows set in Chicago
Twitter accounts